For the Love of Ada is an ITV sitcom that ran between 1970 and 1971. Although not seen on British TV for over 30 years, the complete series began airing again in late 2018 on Talking Pictures TV, albeit edited with certain offensive words muted out.    One of the notable points about this series was there were no opening titles or closing credits in the real sense of the word. Instead both were superimposed on the screen as the 'live' action and script played out on the screen.

Outline
The sitcom stars Irene Handl as Ada Cresswell, a Cockney widow, a pensioner who is prone to malapropisms. She lives with her daughter Ruth Pollitt (Barbara Mitchell) and son-in-law Leslie (Jack Smethurst). Ada starts a relationship with Walter Bingley (Wilfred Pickles), the gravedigger who buried her husband, after meeting him at the cemetery while laying flowers on her husband's grave. Walter is a Yorkshireman; his relationship with Ada slowly changes from one of companionship to one of romance. They get engaged, and later marry, after which they move in together at his cemetery lodge abode.

Cast

Main
Irene Handl as Ada Cresswell (later Bingley)
Wilfred Pickles as Walter Bingley
Barbara Mitchell as Ruth Pollitt (née Cresswell)
Jack Smethurst as Leslie Pollitt

Recurring
Robert Keegan as Jack Pollitt, Leslie's father
Mollie Sugden as Nellie Pollitt, Leslie's mother
Malcolm Rogers as the Vicar
Cecily Hullett as Freda Skinner
Gabrielle Daye as Mrs Armitage
Charles Lamb as Arthur Parsons
Anna Turner as Maggie Bingley
Patsy Rowlands as Pauline Whitehead
Meadows White as Fred Carter
Bert Palmer as Fred Bingley
Ann Way as Florrie Bingley
Ann Beach as Alice Bingley
Gerard Hely as Albert Bingley
Daphne Heard as the nosey neighbour

Transmission dates
Series One
(6 x 25 mins) 20 Apr-25 May 1970 – Mon mostly 9.30pm

Series Two
(7 x 25 mins) 14 Sep-26 Oct 1970 – Mon 9.30pm

Short special  Part of the All-Star Comedy Carnival 25 Dec 1970 – Fri 6pm

Series Three
(7 x 25 mins) 15 Mar-3 May 1971 – Mon 8.30pm

Series Four
(6 x 25 mins) 26 Aug-30 Sep 1971 – Thu 9pm

Christmas special
(38 mins) Boxing Day (27 Dec 1971) – Sun 6.45pm

The entire series was re-broadcast in 2020 and 2021 by Talking Pictures TV.

Film version

A film version, based on the series, was released in 1972. It was directed by Ronnie Baxter and featured the same principal cast, along with an appearance by Arthur English as a colleague of Walter. The plot revolves around a surprise party being planned for Ada and Walter's first wedding anniversary.

American version
For The Love Of Ada spawned an American remake called A Touch of Grace that premiered on ABC in January 1973. This version starred Shirley Booth and J. Pat O'Malley as Grace Simpson and Herbert Morrison, who like their English counterparts fall in love. The American version faced very tough competition from  All In The Family and drew low ratings, resulting in its cancellation in April 1973 after only thirteen episodes, although ABC ran reruns of the show in prime time until June 1973.

See also
 List of films based on British television series

DVD release
All four series of For the Love of Ada were released between 2009 and 2012.

1970 British television series debuts
1971 British television series endings
ITV sitcoms
Television shows adapted into films
1970s British sitcoms
Television shows produced by Thames Television
English-language television shows
Television shows shot at Teddington Studios